Frederick Carr is a meteorologist who was president for the 2016 term of the American Meteorological Society. He was formerly the McCasland Foundation Professor of Meteorology and is now a professor emeritus at the University of Oklahoma School of Meteorology.

References

American meteorologists
American Meteorological Society people
University of Oklahoma faculty
People from Beverly, Massachusetts
Living people
1947 births